Louis-Toussaint Champion de Cicé (Rennes, 5 August 1732—Paris, 28 January 1792) was a French Navy officer. He served in the War of American Independence, earning membership in the Society of the Cincinnati.

Biography 
Champion de Cicé was born to an aristocratic family.

Champion de Cicé joined the Navy as a Garde-Marine on 12 January 1746. He was promoted to Lieutenant on 17 April 1757, and to Captain on 24 March 1772.  He married Jeanne-Geneviève-Henriette de Fusée de Voisenon in 1767.

In 1778, he served as first officer on the 74-gun Zodiaque, part of the First Division of the White squadron in the fleet under Orvilliers. 

In 1780, he was given command of the 64-gun Solitaire in the squadron under Guichen. He took part in the Battle of Fort Royal on 29 avril 1781,  and served under De Grasse, taking part in the Battle of the Chesapeake on 5 September 1781, and in the subsequent Siege of Yorktown.

Champion de Cicé was promoted to Brigadier in 1782, and to Chef d'Escadre on 20 August 1784.

Sources and references 
 Notes

Citations

References
 
 

External links
 
 

French Navy officers
French military personnel of the American Revolutionary War